BeltStrike: Riches and Danger in the Bowman Belt is a 1984 tabletop role-playing game adventure, written by J. Andrew Keith, with a cover by David Deitrick for Traveller published by Game Designers' Workshop. One of the classic Traveller Modules series.

Plot summary
BeltStrike: Riches and Danger in the Bowman Belt is the second in the series of Traveller adventure modules sold in boxed form, and details the asteroid system of Bowman, set in District 268 of the Spinward Marches.

Reception
In the July–August 1984 edition of Space Gamer (No. 70), Craig Sheeley gave a strong recommendation, saying, "Buy Beltstrike.  Where Tarsus was understandably limited, Beltstrike has information applicable anywhere men and aliens mine asteroids." Sheeley 

In the January–February 1985 edition of Different Worlds (Issue #38), Tony Watson gave this book an average 2.5 stars out of 4, and pointed out that issues were not with the content but with the formatting and booklet size used, as well with as the high price charged. He concluded, "As usual. GDW has produced an attractive and well-written play-aid for Traveller; it is unfortunate that in this case that play-aid is inappropriately formatted and certainly too expensive."

See also
 Classic Traveller Modules

References

Role-playing game supplements introduced in 1984
Traveller (role-playing game) adventures